The Roosevelt Park Zoo is a zoo in Minot, North Dakota, the oldest zoo in North Dakota. It opened in 1921 and the first animal exhibition featured the American Bison.  In 1970, the zoo was separated from the city-owned Roosevelt Park and the Greater Minot Zoological Society was created to operate the zoo, it is the oldest zoo in North Dakota.

The zoo is open May through September. The flood of 1969 caused every bird and animal to be moved from the zoo, which led to the redesign of the zoo grounds. A foot bridge, a feline house, and a new bear den were constructed.  The 2011 Souris River Flood caused the animals once again to be relocated from the zoo.  Due to cleanup efforts on the grounds and buildings, the zoo did not open for the 2012 season. The Zoo re-opened on May 4 of 2013.

References

External links 

Zoos in North Dakota
Buildings and structures in Minot, North Dakota
Tourist attractions in Minot, North Dakota
Zoos established in 1921
1921 establishments in North Dakota